Homorus is a genus of air-breathing land snails, terrestrial pulmonate gastropod molluscs in the family Achatinidae.

Species
Species within the genus Homorus include:
 Homorus arabicus (Connolly, 1941)
 Homorus badius (E. von Martens, 1889)
 Homorus burnessi Connolly, 1923
 Homorus courteti Germain, 1907
 Homorus cyanostomus (L. Pfeiffer, 1842)
 Homorus ellerbecki Kobelt, 1905
 Homorus erlangeri Kobelt, 1905
 Homorus fovelolatus Preston, 1909
 Homorus garamulatae Kobelt, 1905
 Homorus ginirensis Kobelt, 1905
 Homorus martensi (Dupuis & Putzeys, 1901)
 Homorus massonianus Crosse, 1888
 Homorus megaspira (Mabille, 1884)
 Homorus nebulosus (Morelet, 1883)
 Homorus nigellus (Morelet, 1867)
 Homorus obesus Kobelt, 1905
 Homorus omeri Connolly, 1928
 Homorus opeas Pilsbry, 1905
 Homorus perlucida Preston, 1910
 Homorus pyramidellus (E. von Martens, 1892)
 Homorus splendens (Thiele, 1910)
Taxon inquirendum
 Homorus foveolatus Preston, 1909 (taxon inquirendum)

References

 Morelet, A., 1868 Mollusques terrestres et fluviatiles. In: Voyage du Dr. Friederich Welwitsch exécuté par ordre du gourvernement portugais dans les royaumes d'Angola et de Benguela, p. 102 pp
 Bank, R. A. (2017). Classification of the Recent terrestrial Gastropoda of the World. Last update: July 16th, 2017.

External links

 Albers, J. C. (1850). Die Heliceen nach natürlicher Verwandtschaft systematisch geordnet. Berlin: Enslin. 262 pp
 Pilsbry, H.A. (1919). A review of the land mollusks of the Belgian Congo chiefly based on the collections of the American Museum Congo Expedition, 1909-1915. Bulletin of the American Museum of Natural History, 40: 1-370, pls I-XXII